Parry Sound High School (PSHS) is a public high school in the town of Parry Sound, Ontario, Canada. The school is one of the largest in the Near North District School Board, with 842 students , and serves as the only high school in Parry Sound.

Parry Sound High School's motto is the Latin Omnia Vestigia Prorsum which translates to "All Steps Forward". Athletes and students at PSHS are known as the PSHS Panthers, and the school colours are cardinal and slate.

The school was founded in 1951.

Notable alumni
 Bill Beagan, ice hockey referee and league commissioner

See also

List of high schools in Ontario

References

External links

 

Educational institutions established in 1951
High schools in Ontario
Parry Sound, Ontario
1951 establishments in Ontario